Slabtown may refer to:

Places
United States
Slabtown, California
Slabtown, Atlanta, Georgia
Slabtown, Portland, Oregon
Homer, Indiana
Slabtown, Indiana
North Industry, Ohio
Slabtown, Pennsylvania
Slabtown, West Virginia
Slabtown, Wisconsin
A residential neighborhood in Traverse City, Michigan

Entertainment
 The Slabtown District Convention, a one-act play written by African-American educator Nannie Helen Burroughs in the 1920s
Slabtown (The Walking Dead), an episode of the fifth season of The Walking Dead